Schmalkald can refer to:
 Schmalkalden - a town in Germany
 Smalcald Articles - a summary of Lutheran doctrine (1537)
 Schmalkaldic League - an alliance of Lutheran princes during mid-16th century
 Schmalkaldic War - war between Schmalkadic League and Charles V of Habsburg